The grammar of the Marathi language shares similarities with other modern Indo-Aryan languages such as Odia, Gujarati or Punjabi. The first modern book exclusively about the grammar of Marathi  was printed in 1805 by Willam Carey.

The principal word order in Marathi is SOV (subject–object–verb). Nouns inflect for gender (masculine, feminine, neuter), number (singular, plural), and case. Marathi preserves the neuter gender found in Sanskrit, a feature further distinguishing it from many Indo-Aryan languages. Typically, Marathi adjectives do not inflect unless they end in an  vowel, in which case they inflect for gender and number. Marathi verbs inflect for tense (past, present, future). Verbs can agree with their subjects, yielding an active voice construction, or with their objects, yielding a passive voice construction. A third type of voice, not found in English for example, is produced when the verb agrees with neither subject nor object. Affixation is largely suffixal in the language and postpositions are attested. An unusual feature of Marathi, as compared to other Indo-European languages, is that it displays the inclusive and exclusive we feature, that is common to the Dravidian languages, Rajasthani, and Gujarati.

The contemporary grammatical rules described by Maharashtra Sahitya Parishad and endorsed by the Government of Maharashtra are supposed to take precedence in standard written Marathi. These rules are described in Marathi Grammar, written by M. R. Walimbe. The book is widely referred to students in schools and colleges.

Sanskrit influence 
Traditions of Marathi Linguistics and above mentioned rules give special status to ‘tatsama’ (तत्सम) words borrowed from the Sanskrit language. This special status expects the rules for ‘tatsama’ words be followed as of Sanskrit grammar.

Parts of speech 
Marathi words can be classified in any of the following parts of speech:

Nominals
Nouns are primarily divided into three categories – proper nouns (विशेषनाम, visheshnāma), common nouns (सामान्यनाम, samānyanāma), and abstract nouns (भाववाचकनाम, bhāvvāchaknāma) – that are identical in definition to their counterparts in other languages (such as English), and are inflected for gender, number and case. They are also often categorized based on their ending vowel, which is especially useful in studying their inflection – those ending in the schwa (or inherent vowel) a (अ) are termed akārānt (अकारान्त), those ending in the vowel ā (आ) are termed ākārānt (आकारान्त), those ending in the vowel ī (ई) are termed īkārānt (ईकारान्त), and so on.

Gender 
There are three genders in Marathi: masculine, feminine, and neuter. Some other modern Indo-European languages have lost these genders, completely, as in English and Persian, or in part, with either neuter and common gender (merging masculine and feminine), as in some Northern Germanic languages, or feminine and masculine (absorbing neuter), as in almost all Romance languages.

While there exists no concrete rules for determining the gender of a given noun, certain observations do help speakers in that regard: masculine nouns can only be akārānt or ākārānt, while neuter nouns can only be akārānt, īkārānt, ukārānt (उकारान्त, ending in u), or ekārānt (एकारान्त, ending in e).

The grammatical gender of common nouns referring to animated objects corresponds to their natural sex – for example, mulgā (मुलगा, 'boy') is a masculine noun, whereas mulgī (मुलगी, 'girl') is a feminine one. Given the masculine forms of such nouns, the feminine noun can often be determined using a set of rules:

 Some ākārānt nouns have corresponding feminine forms as īkārānt with the same root – mulgā/mulgī (boy/girl), kutrā/kutrī (dog/bitch), ghoḍā/ghoḍī (horse/mare).
 Some akārānt nouns also have their corresponding feminine forms as īkārānt with the same root – hansa/hansī (male and female swans), vānar/vānrī (male and female monkeys).
 Some nouns use the suffix -īṇ (ईण) to form their feminine forms – vāgha/vāghīṇ (tiger/tigress), mālaka/mālakīṇ (male and female owners).
 Some nouns have their feminine forms made out of entirely different words – navrā/bāyko (husband/wife), bāp/āī (father/mother), rājā/rāṇī (king/queen).

Similarly, for masculine ākārānt common nouns referring to inanimate objects, the 'diminutive' (लघुत्वदर्शक, lughatvadarshak) forms are feminine, and are īkārānt – danḍā/danḍī (big/small stick), loṭā/loṭī (big/small mug).

Case
There are differences of opinion regarding grammatical cases in Marathi. According to one view, there are two cases: direct, which is unmarked (e.g. Ram 'Ram') and oblique, which is used before adpositions (e.g.  'to Ram', -a being the oblique case marker and -la the dative adposition) and postpositions (e.g.  'from Ram',-a being the oblique case marker and -pasun the postposition). The form of the oblique suffix depends on the gender and the final vowel of the word it is suffixed to.

According to this analysis, true postpositions (like  'from') have a wide range of meanings and can be separated form the noun by clitics like  (e.g. ).  Adpositions (like -la), on the other hand, are only used to mark nominal arguments of the verb in terms of their theta roles and cannot be separated from the noun by clitics (* is ungrammatical).  Syntactically, the latter behave the same as case markers corresponding to the traditional grammar. In this view, the cases are: nominative (unmarked), accusative/dative (singular -la, plural -na), ergative, which is traditionally called 'instrumental' (sg. -ne, pl. -ni) and genitive/possessive.

The class of true postpositions will then include -hatun 'through', -hu(n) 'from'/ablative, -t locative, -jagi 'in place of' and many more. The genitive markers inflect to agree with the governing noun.

Traditional grammar 
In traditional analyses which follow the pattern of Sanskrit grammatical tradition, case suffixes are referred to as (vibhaktī pratyaya) विभक्ती प्रत्यय. There are eight such (vibhaktī) विभक्ती (विभक्ती) in Marathi. The form of the original word changes when such a suffix is to be attached to the word, and the new, modified root is referred to as saamaanya ruup of the original word. For example, the word (ghodā) घोडा (“horse”) gets transformed into (ghodyā-) घोड्या- when the suffix (-var) वर- (“on”) is attached to it to form (ghodyāvar) घोड्यावर (“on the horse”). The nominal suffixes are tabulated below.

Split Ergativity 
Marathi is considered a split ergative language, i.e. it uses both nominative-accusative and ergative-absolutive alignment. In the latter type, the subject of a transitive verb takes the ergative marking (identical to that of the instrumental case) instead of having the same form as the subject of an intransitive verb. This change also results in the verb agreeing with the unmarked noun (usually the object) instead of its subject, as it would in nominative-accusative situations:

Note that it is possible for the unmarked noun to be a direct object despite Marathi having an accusative case: Marathi exhibits Differential object marking for direct objects, and the accusative declension is used in the case of definite or animate objects. 

In case there is no unmarked noun, the verb shows neutral agreement:

As in many Indo-Aryan languages, the ergative split in Marathi is primarily aspect-based, specifically triggered by the perfective for transitive verbs, as seen in the examples above. Furthermore, subjects of intransitive verbs in the obligative subjunctive mood are also marked as ergative, as are third-person subjects in the optative:

Differential object marking 

Marathi, like many Indo-Aryan languages, exhibits differential object marking. Direct objects are marked according to definiteness, with unmarked objects representing indefinite nouns. As such, accusative case markings are not universally required.  

Sentences with both unmarked direct objects and unmarked subjects must follow the unmarked SOV word order. Since the nominative case is typically unmarked, the only time this does not occur is when the subject is a pronoun or in the ergative case, allowing for the usage of marked word orders for emphasis:

An alternate analysis of this situation is that Marathi does not mark the accusative case at all, rather the -ला marker is shared between the dative case and definite differential object marking.

Adjectives 
Adjectives typically precede the noun  (although in adjective phrases they can follow the noun) and are divided into declinable and indeclinable categories. Declinable adjectives end in the vowel -ā (आ) and must be declined for the gender, number and case of the nouns they qualify. Declining adjectives for case is easier compared to declining nouns, since a single ending applies to all cases; a complete table listing the different endings is given below, with the masculine nominative singular as the citation form.

Possessive 
Possessive adjectives in Marathi are slight modifications to the personal pronouns, suffixed with the genitive/possessive case markers – चा/ची/चे (cā/cī/ce), for masculine, feminine and plural subjects respectively. However, in the first and second-person singular the case marking is different, as shown below. Possessive adjectives agree in gender and number with the noun they modify; for plural nouns, the markers change from चा/ची/चे to चे/च्या/ची (ce/cyā/cī), with a similar transformation for the first and second-person singular adjectives.

Demonstrative 
The adjectives हा (hā, this) and तो (to, that) serve as demonstrative adjectives and are always declined for the gender and number of the noun(s) that follows them.

Pronouns 
There are three grammatical persons (पुरुष purushh) in Marathi. There is gender distinction in the first- and second-persons when the pronouns act as agreement markers on verbs; as independent pronouns this distinction in lost.

Verbs
Verb stems can end in a vowel (ākārānt, īkārānt, or ekārānt) or a consonant (akārānt) and are declined for person, gender and number. They are usually listed in dictionaries in their infinitive forms, which consist of the verb stem with the suffix – ṇe (णे); for example खाणे (khāṇē, to eat), बोलणे (bolaṇē, to speak), चालणे (cālaṇē, to walk). Verbs are fairly regular, although the copula and other auxiliaries are notable exceptions.

The verbal system, much like in other Indo-Aryan languages, revolves around a combination of aspect and tense – there are 3 main aspects (perfect, imperfect, and habitual) and 3 main tenses (present, past, and future). Tenses are marked using conjugations, while aspects are marked using suffixes and by adding conjugations of a copula/auxiliary verb.

Copula 
The verb असणे (asṇē, to be) is an irregular verb that acts as the copula / auxiliary for all tenses and for the perfect and imperfect aspects; its conjugations are shown below.

The habitual aspect uses a different set of conjugations of the same auxiliary verb (असणे); for present-tense and past-tense these conjugations are shown below. In future tense a different auxiliary verb, जाणे (jāṇē, to go), is typically used.

Causatives 
Causatives are created from existing verb stems and typically follow the set of patterns listed below.

 Attaching 'व' (va) to the stem of the verb; in modern literature 'व' is often replaced by 'वि' (vi). So हसणे (hasaṇē, to laugh) → हसवणे/हसविणे (hasavṇē/hasviṇē, to cause to laugh); चालणे (cālaṇē, to walk) → चालवणे/चालविणे (cālavṇē/cālviṇē, to cause to walk).
 For verbs with stems that have single syllables (खा, घे, दे; khā, ghē, dē), attach 'ववि' (vavi) instead of 'व'. Thus, खाणे (khāṇē, to eat) → खावविणे (khāvaviṇē, to cause to eat); देणे (dēṇē, to give) → देवविणे (dēvaviṇē, to cause to give).
 Root vowel change: a → ā (अ → आ), u/ū → o (उ/ऊ → ओ), i/ī → e (इ/ई → ए); sometimes also accompanied by the root final consonant change 'ṭ' → 'ṛ' (ट → ड). So तुटणे (tuṭaṇē, to be broken) → तोडणे (toṛaṇē, to cause to broken/to break); गळणे (gaḷaṇē, to be buried) → गाळणे (gāḷaṇē, to cause to be buried/to bury).

Imperatives 
The imperative form of a verb (called आज्ञार्थ, ādñārtha) is formed by applying a simple set of rules to the stem of the verb, and has second-person singular (where there is a distinction between formal and informal) and second-person plural forms (which are the same as the second-person singular formal).

 For akārānt verbs, the informal imperative form is the verb stem itself. The formal imperative is formed by utilizing the transformation a → ā (अ → आ) to the stem vowel.
 For ākārānt verbs, the imperative form (formal and informal) is the verb stem itself.
 For īkārānt and ekārānt verbs, the informal imperative is the verb stem itself. The formal imperative is formed by transforming the final vowel to the semi-vowel या (yā).
 Negative imperative forms are constructed by adding the suffix -ऊ (ū) to the verb stem, and then by adding a separate negative particle नकोस/नको (nakosa/nako, for informal imperative) or नका (nakā, for formal imperative).

Voice 
Traditional grammar distinguishes three grammatical voices (प्रयोग, prayog) in Marathi.

 Active voice (कर्तरी प्रयोग kartrī prayog) refers to a sentence construction in which the verb changes according to the subject

 Passive voice (कर्मणी प्रयोग karmanī prayog) refers to a sentence construction in which the verb changes according to the object

 Bhāve prayog (भावे प्रयोग) refers to a sentence construction in which the verb does not change according to either the subject or the object. This is used for imperatives.

Sentence structure 
A Marathi sentence generally has three parts: subject (कर्ता kartā), object (कर्म karma), and verb (क्रियापद kriyāpad). In a Marathi sentence, the subject comes first, then the object, and finally the verb. However, in some sentences there is no object.

See also:
Marathi language

References

Bibliography

External links 

 
Indo-Aryan grammars